Sorbia laterialba is a species of beetle in the family Cerambycidae. It was described by Stephan von Breuning in 1939.

References

Mesosini
Beetles described in 1939